Francisco Carlos Barretto Júnior (born 31 October 1989) is a Brazilian male artistic gymnast and a member of the national team. He participated at the 2015 World Artistic Gymnastics Championships in Glasgow, and qualified for the 2016 Summer Olympics. He competed at the 2020 Summer Olympics.

References

External links

 

1989 births
Living people
Brazilian male artistic gymnasts
Gymnasts at the 2011 Pan American Games
Gymnasts at the 2015 Pan American Games
Gymnasts at the 2019 Pan American Games
Pan American Games medalists in gymnastics
Pan American Games gold medalists for Brazil
Pan American Games silver medalists for Brazil
Gymnasts at the 2016 Summer Olympics
Olympic gymnasts of Brazil
South American Games gold medalists for Brazil
South American Games silver medalists for Brazil
South American Games bronze medalists for Brazil
South American Games medalists in gymnastics
Competitors at the 2010 South American Games
Competitors at the 2014 South American Games
Competitors at the 2018 South American Games
Competitors at the 2022 South American Games
Medalists at the 2019 Pan American Games
Medalists at the 2011 Pan American Games
Medalists at the 2015 Pan American Games
Gymnasts at the 2020 Summer Olympics
People from Ribeirão Preto
Sportspeople from São Paulo (state)
21st-century Brazilian people